Gwyneth Jones may refer to:

 Gwyneth Jones (soprano) (born 1936), Welsh soprano
 Gwyneth Jones (novelist) (born 1952), British science fiction novelist

See also
Gwyn Jones (disambiguation)